Alexandre Hocevar (born 19 February 1963) is a former professional tennis player from Brazil.

Biography

Career
Hocevar was born in Ijuí and began competing professionally in 1982.

Most successful as a doubles player, he appeared in the men's doubles draws of both the French Open and Wimbledon during his career, as well as making the semi-finals of Grand Prix tournaments at Itaparica and Guarujá in 1980s. He won a total of eight doubles titles at Challenger level, four of them with his brother Marcos.

As a singles player he made it as high as 169 in the world and was runner-up at the Dublin Challenger in 1987. His best performance on the ATP Tour (previously Grand Prix) came at the Guarujá Open in 1990, where he had wins over Otávio Della, Mario Tabares and Cássio Motta to reach the semi-finals.

Personal life
Elder brother Marcos Hocevar played Davis Cup tennis for Brazil. A nephew, Ricardo, who is the son of another brother Jorge, was also a professional tennis player.

His surname, Hocevar, is Slovenian.

Challenger titles

Doubles: (8)

Notes
 According to online ITF records his best performance at the French Open was the third round in 1983 with Sergio Casal. The ATP website however credits this to his brother Marcos.

References

External links
 
 

1963 births
Living people
Brazilian male tennis players
People from Ijuí
Sportspeople from Rio Grande do Sul
20th-century Brazilian people
21st-century Brazilian people